Makhlouf Naït Rabah (born April 9, 1996) is an Algerian footballer who last played for JS Kabylie in the Algerian Ligue Professionnelle 1. He plays primarily as a left-back.

Career
Naït Rabah started his career with JS Kabylie as a youngster in 2006, and represented Algeria at the Danone Nations Cup in 2008.

References

External links
 

1996 births
Algerian footballers
Algerian Ligue Professionnelle 1 players
JS Kabylie players
Kabyle people
Living people
Footballers from Tizi Ouzou
Association football fullbacks
21st-century Algerian people